

Erich Karl Alexander Petersen (25 August 1889 – 4 July 1963) was a German general during the Second World War. 

Petersen served as commander of the 7th Air Division, until being tapped for promotion to commanding general of the IV Luftwaffe Field Corps. He also served as commanding general of the LXXXX Army Corps. Following the war, he was tried and acquitted of war crimes in France. He was released on 18 January 1950.

References 

|-

1889 births
1963 deaths
Luftwaffe World War II generals
People indicted for war crimes
Reichswehr personnel
Recipients of the Gold German Cross
Generals of Aviators